Alejandra Sandoval (born 23 August 1980) is a Colombian actress.

Biography
Alejandra was born in the city of Cali where she was raised by her single mother. After high school, she joined the Universidad de San Buenaventura to study psychology.

In 2014, she was cast as the protagonist of the upcoming telenovela Amor Secreto to be produced by Venevisión alongside Miguel de León.

Personal life
Alejandra has a daughter named Valeria Sandoval.. In March 2015, Alejandra married her long-time boyfriend Jorge Reyes at a private ceremony held in Isla Margarita. In September 2015, the couple announced they were expecting their first child.
Her oldest daughter got married in 2016 and her youngest daughter was already born

Filmography

Films

Television

References

External links
 

1980 births
Actresses from Cali
Living people
21st-century Colombian actresses
Colombian telenovela actresses
Colombian emigrants to Venezuela